Gouessesso is a village in western Ivory Coast. It is in the sub-prefecture of Biankouma, Biankouma Department, Tonkpi Region, Montagnes District.

References 
tageo.com

Populated places in Montagnes District
Populated places in Tonkpi